The Split is a British legal drama television series, written and created by Abi Morgan, that first broadcast in the United Kingdom on BBC One on 24 April 2018. The first series, commissioned in August 2016, follows the lives of the Defoe family, who all work in divorce law for the family firm, aside from eldest sister Hannah (Nicola Walker), who works for rival family law firm Noble & Hale and youngest daughter who is a nanny. The series co-stars Stephen Mangan, Fiona Button, Annabel Scholey and Barry Atsma. Series 2 saw the return of the Defoe family at newly merged law firm Noble Hale Defoe, with most of the original cast confirmed. The third and final series premiered on 4 April 2022. For her performance in the final series, Walker received a TV Choice Award nomination for Best Actress and a National Television Award nomination for Drama Performance while The Split was nominated for Returning Drama.

Cast

Main
 Nicola Walker as Hannah Stern, a divorce lawyer working for Noble & Hale
 Stephen Mangan as Nathan Stern, Hannah's husband, a barrister
 Fiona Button as Rose Defoe, Hannah's youngest sister
 Annabel Scholey as Nina Defoe, Hannah's younger sister, a fellow divorce lawyer for Defoe's, the family practice
 Barry Atsma as Christie Carmichael, Hannah's former boyfriend who also works for Noble & Hale
 Stephen Tompkinson as Davey McKenzie, a millionaire divorcing his wife (series 1)
 Meera Syal as Goldie McKenzie, Davey's wife and his company's secretary (series 1, 3)
 Anthony Head as Oscar Defoe, Hannah's long lost father (series 1)
 Deborah Findlay as Ruth Defoe, Hannah's mother, the director of the family firm
 Rudi Dharmalingam as James Cutler, Rose's fiancé, later husband
 Chukwudi Iwuji as Alexander 'Zander' Hale, director of Noble Hale Defoe
 Donna Air as Fi Hansen, a famous presenter divorcing her husband (series 2)
 Ben Bailey Smith as Richie Hansen, Fi's husband (series 2)
 Damien Molony as Tyler Donaghue, Zander's fiancé, later husband (series 2-3)
 Ian McElhinney as Prof Ronnie, a friend and later love interest of Ruth Defoe (series 2-3)
 Lara Pulver as Kate Pencastle, a child psychologist and Nathan's new partner (series 3)

Supporting
 Kobna Holdbrook-Smith as Glen Peters, the vicar performing Rose and James' wedding ceremony (series 1, 3)
 Maggie O'Neill as Yvonne Duchy, Goldie's best friend, who is having an affair with her husband (series 1)
 Josette Simon as Maya, Oscar Defoe's second partner (series 1)
 Mathew Baynton as Rex Pope, a stand-up comedian (series 1-2)
 Elizabeth Roberts as Liv Stern, Hannah and Nathan's elder daughter
 Mollie Cowen as Tilly Stern, Hannah and Nathan's younger daughter
 Toby Oliver as Vinnie Stern, Hannah and Nathan's son
 Ellora Torchia as Maggie Lavelle, a junior solicitor at Noble & Hale (series 1-2)
 Amaka Okafor as Chloe, a junior associate working with Nathan (series 2)
 Brenock O'Connor as Sasha, Liv Stern's boyfriend (series 1)
 Kerry Fox as Judge Joyce Aspen (series 1)
 Anna Chancellor as Melanie Aickman, a family lawyer (series 2-3)
 Karen Bryson as Leonora 'Lennie' Hale, Zander's sister who is seeking to divorce her husband (series 3)
 Clarence Smith as Felix Sanderson, Leonora's husband (series 3)
 Alex Guersman as Gael, Liv's Argentinian fiancé (series 3)
 Lindsay Duncan as Caroline, the ex-wife of a deceased earl (series 3)
 Jemima Rooper as India, the young widow of the late earl (series 3)
 Radhika Aggarwal as Prisha, wife of the recipient of James's heart (series 3) 
 Gerald Kyd as J. J. Johnson, a family lawyer (series 3)

Production
Production for the first series began in July 2017 in London. On 13 January 2017, SundanceTV announced that it would be partnering with the BBC to produce the series. SundanceTV will thus hold exclusive rights for broadcast in the United States. Series 1 was released on DVD on 4 June 2018.

A  second series was commissioned in May 2018 with production beginning in March 2019. Donna Air and Ben Bailey Smith joined the cast for the second series as high-profile clients for the law firm and Damien Molony as the character Tyler Donaghue. The first episode of series 2 aired in the UK on BBC One on 11 February 2020 and in the United States on Sundance TV beginning on 15 May 2020. During filming Series 2, production visited Maidstone TV Studios to film a studio show segment.

Series 3 premiered on BBC One on 4 April 2022. All six episodes were released on BBC iPlayer on the same day. Season three premiered on AMC+ and Sundance Now in the US on 23 June 2022 in full a week ahead of its linear broadcast premiere, with the show moving from SundanceTV to sister network BBC America, starting 27 June, with each episode airing weekly. It is unknown if season 3 will air in simulcast on both networks or not.

Episodes

Series overview

Season 1 (2018)

Season 2 (2020)

Season 3 (2022)

References

External links
 
 
 

2018 British television series debuts
2022 British television series endings
2010s British drama television series
2010s British legal television series
2020s British drama television series
2020s British legal television series
BBC television dramas
English-language television shows
Television series about marriage
Television series about sisters